Wyn is a Welsh surname and given name. Notable people with the name include:

people with the surname:
A. A. Wyn (1898–1967), American magazine publisher 
Aled Wyn Davies (born 1974), classical tenor from Powys, Wales
Alun Wyn Davies, Welsh rugby union footballer
Alun Wyn Jones (born 1985), Welsh rugby union player 
Cerith Wyn Evans (born 1958), conceptual artist, sculptor and film maker
Dyfed Wyn-Evans (born 1969), baritone opera singer who grew up in Wales
Owain Wyn Evans (born 1984), Welsh meteorologist, and drummer; weather presenter for the BBC
Eirug Wyn (1950–2004), Welsh satirical novelist who wrote in Welsh
Eliseus Williams (Eifion Wyn) (1867–1926), Welsh language poet
Elizabeth Wyn Wood (1903–1966), Canadian sculptor, born in Orillia
Emyr Wyn Lewis (born 1982), Welsh rugby union footballer
Eurig Wyn (1944–2019), Welsh politician
Geraint Wyn Davies (born 1957), Welsh-Canadian actor
Hedd Wyn (1887–1917), Merionethshire farmer and Welsh language poet of World War I
Ieuan Wyn Jones, AM (born 1949), leader of Plaid Cymru, Deputy First Minister
Llewelyn Wyn Griffith (1890–1977), Welsh novelist
Nesta Wyn Ellis, Welsh politician and writer
Owen Wyn Owen, automobile restorer and mechanic
Percy Wyn-Harris (1903–1979), English mountaineer, political administrator, and yachtsman

people with the given name:
Wyn Belotte (born 1984), Canadian soccer player
Wyn Calvin (born 1926), veteran Welsh comedian and entertainer
Wyn Cooper, American poet
Wyn Davies (born 1942), former professional Welsh football player
Wyn Davies (conductor) a Welsh conductor
Ieuan Wyn Jones (born 1949), Welsh politician, Plaid Cymru member
Wyn Morris (1929–2010), Welsh conductor
Wyn Roberts, Baron Roberts of Conwy (born 1930), Welsh Conservative politician

See also
Wyn (letter)
Wynn (disambiguation)
Wynne (disambiguation)
Win (disambiguation)
 

Welsh masculine given names
Surnames of Welsh origin